Buoniconti is a surname. Notable people with the surname include:

Nick Buoniconti (1940–2019), American football player, and born in Springfield, Mass.
Stephen Buoniconti (born 1969), American politician

The Italian meaning of Buoniconti is, good person.